Denver is both an English surname and given name. Notable people with the name include:

Surname
 Bob Denver (1935–2005), actor most famous for playing the title character of Gilligan's Island
 James W. Denver (1817–1892), American politician for whom the Colorado capital is named
 John Denver (1943–1997), American singer-songwriter and actor
 Karl Denver (1931-1998), Scottish singer
 Matthew Denver (1870-1954), American politician and banker, son of James Denver

Given name
 Denver Beanland (born 1945), Australian politician
 Denver Colorado (politician), vice mayor of Trece Martires in the Philippines
 Denver Lopez (born 1980), retired Philippine Basketball Association player
 Denver Nicks, American journalist and photographer
 Denver Pyle (1920–1997), actor and film star
 Denver Randleman, (1920-2003), member of the Band of Brothers.
 Denver Riggleman (born 1970), American businessman and politician
 Denver, city in Colorado